Esther Shumiatcher-Hirschbein (Yiddish: אסתר שומיאַטשער־הירשבײן) was a Belarusian-born Canadian and American Yiddish poet and screenwriter.

Biographical details
Shumiatcher was born on October 21, 1896 in Gomel to parents Judah and Chasia as one of eleven siblings. (Katz gives her birth year as 1899.) She and her family emigrated to Calgary, Alberta, Canada in 1911. All members of the family worked to support the household; they also had boarders in their house. Shumiatcher worked as a waitress and at a meat-packing plant until 1918, when she met and married Peretz Hirschbein, a Yiddish playwright from New York City, when he was on tour in Calgary.

Shumiatcher had her son, Omus, in 1934 in New York. He would grow to become a prominent concert producer. Shumiatcher moved to Los Angeles in 1940 where her husband had an offer to write film scripts, of which one was produced. Her husband died in 1948 from lateral sclerosis, after which Shumiatcher primarily gave lectures. She eventually moved back to New York City, where she died in 1985.

Career
Herschbein exposed Shumiatcher to the Yiddish literary community, which inspired her to start writing in Yiddish as well. The couple settled in New York, but traveled extensively around the world, going through places such as the South Pacific, Asia, and Eastern Europe. In the 1920s they lived in Warsaw, Poland, where Shumiatcher's poetry was well received and published in modernist journals of the time. One such journal based in Berlin took its name, Albatros, from one of her poems.

Shumiatcher wrote groundbreaking poems addressing pregnancy and motherhood following the birth of Omus. She also wrote about widowhood and grief following her husband's death. Other themes reflected eros, nature, and politics. Although she did not write much after 1956, her later works are more highly regarded. Some of her poetry has been translated by Myra Mniewski.

She appears in Ezra Kerman's anthology of Yiddish female poets and is included among a group of Litvak women poets whom Dovid Katz credits with "building" Yiddish poetry outside Eastern Europe.

Selected works
In Tol (1920)
Pasn Likht (1925)
In Shoen Fun Libshaft (1930)
Ale Tog (1939)
Lider (1956)

References

Jewish women writers
20th-century Canadian poets
American poets in Yiddish
Canadian poets by language
Canadian women screenwriters
Canadian women poets
1896 births
1985 deaths
People from Gomel
Writers from Calgary
Belarusian emigrants to Canada
Jewish Canadian writers
20th-century Canadian women writers
20th-century Canadian screenwriters